Bengali Christians are adherents of Christianity among the Bengali people. Christianity took root in Bengal after the arrival of Portuguese voyagers in the 16th century. It witnessed further conversions among the Bengali upper-caste elite during the 19th century Bengali Renaissance.

Bengali Christians have made significant contributions to Bengali culture, commerce and society. The region is home to venerable Christian missionary institutions, including the Missionaries of Charity founded by Mother Teresa.

History

Christianity was established in Bengal by the Portuguese missionaries in the 16th century. Basilica of the Holy Rosary, Bandel is the first church known to have been constructed in 1599 at Hugli-Chuchura in the Hooghly district of West Bengal, India. Another is known to have been established from the historical records was in Ishwaripore, Jessore (erstwhile Chandecan) in 1600 under patronage of Pratapaditya which later was ransacked. Chittagong (erstwhile also referred to as Diang) with significant Portuguese and trading settlements had first hermitage and churches erected around this time. The Portuguese settlement in Chittagong hosted the first Vicar Apostolic in Bengal. The Portuguese from there moved to Arakan, where they would transport Hindu and Muslim slaves, about 42,000 in number from 1621 to 1624, and converted 28,000 of those enslaved peoples to Christianity. Jesuit missionaries also established churches in Bandel and Dhaka. In 1682, there were 14,120 Roman Catholics in Bengal. William Carey translated the Bible into Bengali in 1809. Many upper-class Bengalis in the British Indian capital Calcutta converted to Christianity during the Bengal Renaissance.

The Missionaries of Charity was founded by the Mother Teresa in Calcutta in 1950. It played a major role in supporting and sheltering refugees during the Bangladesh Liberation War in 1971.

Denominations

Roman Catholic Church
The Catholic Church in Bangladesh is based in the Archdiocese of Dhaka, with dioceses in Dinajpur, Mymensingh, Sylhet and Rajshahi and Archdiocese of Chittagong, with dioceses on Barisal and Khulna .
Province of Dhaka: Metropolitan Archdiocese of Dhaka
Diocese of Dinajpur
Diocese of Mymensingh
Diocese of Rajshahi
Diocese of Sylhet
Province of Chittagong: Metropolitan Archdiocese of Chittagong
Diocese of Barisal
Diocese of Khulna

The Roman Catholic Church in West Bengal is based in the Archdiocese of Calcutta.
Province of Calcutta: Metropolitan Archdiocese of Calcutta
Diocese of Asansol
Diocese of Bagdogra
Diocese of Baruipur
Diocese of Darjeeling
Diocese of Jalpaiguri
Diocese of Krishnagar
Diocese of Raiganj

Anglican Communion
There are three dioceses of the Anglican Church of Bangladesh:
Diocese of Dhaka
Diocese of Kushtia
Diocese of Barisal

St. Paul's Cathedral, Kolkata is the seat of the Anglican Diocese of Calcutta (1813) of the Church of North India (CNI).
Diocese of Barrackpore 
Diocese of Durgapur 
Diocese of Calcutta

Other denominations
Other denominations include:
Assemblies of God in India(AG)
India Pentecostal Church of God(IPC)
The Pentecostal Mission(TPM)
House church of Bangladesh (HCB)
Armenian Apostolic Church
Bengal Orissa Bihar Baptist Convention
Brethren in Christ Church
Church of God (Anderson)
El Shaddai
New Life Fellowship Association
United Missionary Church of India
The Salvation Army
Victory Family Centre (VFC)
Bangladesh Methodist Church(BMC)
Bangladesh Baptist Church Sangha (BBCS)
Bangladesh Baptist Church Fellowship (BBCF)
Isa-e Church (Bangladesh)

Demographics
Bengali Christians are considered a model minority in South Asia and usually enjoy a high literacy rate, low male-female sex ratio and a better socio-economic status. Christian missionaries operate many schools, hospitals and shelters for the poor. They receive support from the Indian and Bangladeshi governments.

Dhaka, Chittagong, Barisal, Khulna and Northern District Side have significant Christian populations.

Culture

Lusophone heritage
Most Catholic Bengali Christians have Portuguese surnames. In a tradition similar to Bengali Muslims (who have Arabic and Persian names), Bengali Christians adopted Portuguese surnames due to the early influence of Portuguese missionaries in spreading Christianity. Common Catholic Bengali Christian surnames include Gomes, Rozario, D'Costa, Gonsalvez, Cruze, Dias, D'Silva and D'Souza among others.

Christmas is known as "Borodin" (Big Day) and is a public holiday in both Bangladesh and Indian West Bengal.

Notable Bengali Christians

movement. 
Golaknath Chatterjee, the Rev. Bengali Missionary and grandfather of Amrit Kaur
Lal Behari Dey, Bengali Christian Missionary, writer and journalist  
Kali Charan  Banerjee, Lawyer, Indian independence movement activist and founding member of the Indian National Congress.
Kali Charan Chatterjee,  Bengali christian Missionary and first moderator of the Presbyterian Church in India.
Krishna Mohan Banerjee, Educationist, linguist and Bengali Christian missionary, First President of the Bengal Christian Association. 
Gyanendra Mohan Tagore, First Asian Barrister,  
Brahmabandhav Upadhyay, Bengali theologian, journalist and freedom fighter in the Indian independence movement

Religious Leaders

Rev. Nirod Biswas, first Indian Anglican Bishop of Assam
Cardinal Patrick D'Rozario
Poulinous Costa, Archbishop
Michael Rosario, Archbishop
Moses Montu Costa, the late Archbishop of Chittagong
Rt. Rev Samuel S Mankhin, Moderator Bishop, Dhaka Diocese
Rt. Rev Shourabh Pholia, Bishop of Barishal Diocese
Theotonius Amal Ganguly, former Bishop of Dacca
Rt. Rev Hemen Halder, Bishop of Kushtia Diocese
Joy Govinda Shome, theologian and founder of Calcutta Christo Samaj
Alvin P Bhakta, Reverend
Nathaniel Shetu Munshi Reverend
Nibaron Das Bishop

Freedom Fighters
Kali Charan Banerjee

Arts
Michael Madhusudan Dutt, 19th century poet and playwright
Toru Dutt, poet
Badal Sircar, noted Bengali playwright and dramatist.
Samar Das, musician
Debabrata Biswas, musician
Andrew Kishore, Bangladeshi playback singer
Robin Ghosh, Bangladeshi playback singer and film music composer
Tony Dias, Bangladeshi television actor and director
George Lincoln D'Costa, Bangladeshi Metal Singer

Industry
Samson Chowdhury, founder of Square Pharmaceuticals, Bangladesh 
Tapan Chowdhury (businessman), Bangladesh 
Anjan Chowdhury, Bangladesh

Scholars
Chandramukhi Basu, first female graduate of British India
Radhanath Sikdar, Indian mathematician
Ashis Nandy, Indian sociologist
Sukumari Bhattacharji, Indologist
Patrick Das Gupta, physicist and retired Professor, University of Delhi
Antony Gomes, physiologist and retired Professor, University of Calcutta
Aparna Gomes, Biologist and Retired Scientist, Indian Institute of Chemical Biology
James Gomes, Professor of Biology, Indian Institute of Technology, New Delhi
Premen Addy, historian and journalist

Educators
Reverend Lal Bihari Shah, set up the first school for the Blind in Eastern India at Behala, Kolkata
Mona Hensman, née Mitter, former Principal, Ethiraj College for Women, Chennai
Surendra Kumar Datta, former Principal, Forman Christian College, Lahore, Pakistan.
S. K. Rudra, first Indian Principal of St. Stephen's College, Delhi

Journalists
Prannoy Roy
Pritish Nandy

Politicians

Harendra Coomar Mookerjee, First Governor of West Bengal
Hubert Costa, Bangladeshi-Polish Member of Parliament
Promode Mankin, First Catholic and first member of the country's among Christian community to become a government minister in Bangladesh (as a member of the Bangladesh Awami League) and formerly representing Mymensingh-1 (constituency) (whom his son became his successor).
Jewel Areng, son of Promode Mankin. He is the youngest member of parliament (as a member of the Bangladesh Awami League) and the only Catholic, currently representing Mymensingh-1 (constituency) (whom his father was also his predecessor).
Gloria Jharna Sarker, Bangladesh's first Christian Woman MP (2019)

Bangladesh Army
Brigadier John Gomes

Indian Defence Services
Lionel Protip Sen, General in the Indian Army

Sports
Sudhir Kumar Chatterjee, Indian footballer
Paresh Lal Roy, Indian boxer
Hemanta Vincent Biswas, Bangladeshi national team footballer

See also
Christianity in Bangladesh
Christianity in West Bengal

References

http://www.asianews.it/news-en/Bangladesh’s-first-Catholic-woman-MP-dedicates-her-victory-to-all-Christians-46249.html

Christian communities of India
Christianity in Bangladesh
Indian Christians
Ethnoreligious groups in India
Social groups of West Bengal
Social groups of India
Social groups of Bangladesh